Drew High School is the name of multiple secondary schools in the United States, among them:

 Drew Central High School, Monticello, Arkansas
 Drew School, San Francisco, California
 Charles Drew High School, Riverdale, Georgia
 Drew Charter School, Atlanta, Georgia
 Drew High School (Mississippi), former school in Drew, Mississippi